The Church of St Margaret is the Anglican Grade I listed parish church for the village of Laceby in Lincolnshire. Listed since 1967 and dedicated to St Margaret of Antioch, it seats today approximately 300 people.

History and description
The church is built of ironstone rubble and squared blocks with some chalk and flint rubble. There are limestone ashlar dressings and facing to the top stage of the tower, which dates to the 14th or 15th-century. The lower part of the tower dates to the 10th or early 11th-century. Other parts of the church, including the nave also date from the 10th to the 11th-century, while the remainder of the arcade dates to the 13th-century. The chancel is also 13th-century with the remains of blind arcading of that century and with 14th to 15th-century windows, while the pointed chancel arch is 19th-century. Other Norman features include the main doorway arch inside the porch, a fine crenelated arch opposite the main door, separating the nave from the north aisle, and a window opening with more recent glazing dedicated to St Margaret.

Extensive rebuilding and restoration took place in 1869 by James Fowler, architect of Louth. At this time a clerestory at the top of the nave walls was removed and the roof line altered. Construction included the north aisle, chancel and much of the nave, while a new porch and vestry were added. During these restoration grave covers dating to the 10th, or early 11th-century, were incorporated into the church's interior. A small, blocked-up, Norman era window was also found on the east side of the porch. This was restored and stained glass depicting St Margaret of Antioch was installed. A matching window was created on the west side of the porch and installed with a depiction of St. John the Baptist. Special services, led by Christopher Wordsworth, the Bishop of Lincoln, were held on 18 May 1870 to commemorate the re-opening of the restored church. An organ-chamber was added in 1912. A mass dial is to be found on the outside of the west pillar of the main doorway. 

The 1885 Kelly's Directory describes St. Margaret's as being built from Ancaster stone in Early English and Perpendicular styles, consisting of a chancel, nave, west porch and an embattled tower with pinnacles and four bells. Open benches for seating were added in 1850, and an organ in 1852. A monument to W. Laud (d. 1424) is in the chancel. At the east end of the nave can be found a floor slab to Ralph Ballel of 1730 with an oval panel with his arms and crest carved in relief. 
 
The parish register dates from 1538, with a complete list of parish incumbents from the 12th century – one entry relates to the execution of a witch in 1546. In 1583 John Whitgift, a former St Margaret's rector from 1572 to 1577 who had become Bishop of Worcester, was appointed as Archbishop of Canterbury by Queen Elizabeth I. He had been born in nearby Grimsby in 1530.

St Margaret's is in The Laceby and Ravendale Group of churches, in the Deanery of Haverstoe and the Diocese of Lincoln. With St Margaret's, the Group includes St Andrew's at Irby upon Humber, and St Mary's at Hatcliffe. In 2013 the church held its 124th annual church garden party.

References

External links
St Margaret's, Laceby Church of England website 
St Margaret's, Laceby, Facebook page

Church of England church buildings in Lincolnshire
English Gothic architecture in Lincolnshire
Grade I listed churches in Lincolnshire
Borough of North East Lincolnshire
10th-century church buildings in England
10th-century establishments in England